En lo Claro is the third and final studio album by Puerto Rican reggaeton performer Voltio, released on November 20, 2007 by Sony BMG. It received a nomination for Best Latin Urban Album at the Grammy Awards of 2009.

Track listing
 "Perco C" (DJ Giann, Dexter & Mr. Greenz) — 2:31
 "El Mellao" (Almonte) — 3:42
 "Yo Sé Que Tiemblas" (Stixx, AX) — 3:16
 "Me Pones Mal" (Nely "El Arma Secreta") — 4:04
 "Pónmela" (featuring Jowell y Randy) (DJ Giann, Dexter & Mr. Greenz) — 4:00
 "Feka" (featuring Vivanativa) (Vivanativa, Chile, Vivoni) — 3:34
 "Baile y Seducción" (Gabo, Chile, Vivoni) — 3:17
 "Un Amor Como Tú" (featuring Arcángel) (Vivoni, Chile) — 3:53
 "Tú Te Crees" (featuring Pirulo) — 3:27
 "Pelea" — 3:57
 "Tamo' a lo Loco" (DJ Nelson) — 3:56
 "Perdóname" (Nely "El Arma Secreta") — 3:35
 "Cristina" (featuring Cucu Diamantes) — 4:25
 "En lo Claro" (Stixx, AX) — 4:54

Singles

Chart performance
Though not as successful as Voltio's past two albums, the album still managed to peak at number 36 on the U.S. Billboard Top Latin Albums chart. The album also peaked at number 24 on the Billboard Top Heatseekers chart.

Chart positions

References

2007 albums
Julio Voltio albums